Bill Jenkins may refer to:

Bill Jenkins (politician) (born 1936), American politician
Bill Jenkins (drag racer) (1930–2012), American drag racer
Bill Jenkins (Royal Marines officer) (1925–2002), youngest Royal Marine to win a DSO in the Second World War
Bill Jenkins (epidemiologist) (1945–2019), government whistleblower
Bill Jenkins (priest) (born 1963), bishop coadjutor-elect in the Reformed Episcopal Church
Bill Jenkins (voice actor), American voice actor for Funimation

See also
Bill Jenkings (1915–1996), Australian news reporter
Billy Jenkins (disambiguation)
William Jenkins (disambiguation)